Kecskeméti Atlétika és Rugby Club is a Hungarian rugby club in Kecskemét. They currently play in the Extraliga.

History
The club was founded in the spring of 1979 by a couple of students and teachers at the Kecskeméti Gépipari és Automatizálási Műszaki Főiskola (Kecskemét College of Engineering and Automation Technology). This makes KARC the oldest rugby club still playing in the league.

The club has been in its present form since 1996, when the Kecskeméti Sport Club merged with the rugby club. It won the national championship in 1998.

Historical names
 1979 - Kecskeméti GAMF (Kecskeméti Gépipari és Automatizálási Műszaki Főiskola)
 1995 – Kecskeméti RC (Kecskeméti Rugby Club)
 1996 – Kecskeméti ARC (Kecskeméti Atlétika és Rugby Club)

Honours
 Nemzeti Bajnokság I
 1998

Current squad

References

External links
  Kecskeméti Atlétika és Rugby Club

Hungarian rugby union teams
Rugby clubs established in 1979